The year 2016 is the 6th year in the history of the ONE Championship, a mixed martial arts promotion based in Singapore.

List of events

Grand Prix bracket

Changsha Bantamweight Tournament

ONE Changsha Bantamweight Tournament bracket

Hefei Flyweight Tournament

ONE Hefei Flyweight Tournament bracket

Myanmar Featherweight Tournament

ONE Myanmar Featherweight Tournament bracket

ONE Championship: Dynasty of Champions (Changsha)

ONE Championship: Dynasty of Champions (Changsha) (also known as ONE Championship 36) was a mixed martial arts event held by ONE Championship. The event was on January 23, 2016 at the SWC Stadium in Changsha, China.
Background

ONE Championship returned to Mainland China holding the fourth title defense for ONE Bantamweight Champion Bibiano Fernandes.

Results

ONE Championship: Clash of Heroes

ONE Championship: Clash of Heroes (also known as ONE Championship 37) was a mixed martial arts event held by ONE Championship. The event was on January 29, 2016 at the Stadium Negara in Kuala Lumpur, Malaysia.

Background

ONE Championship returns to Malaysia with more thrilling action.

Results

ONE Championship: Tribe of Warriors

ONE Championship: Tribe of Warriors (also known as ONE Championship 38) was a mixed martial arts event held by ONE Championship. The event was held on February 20, 2016 at the Istora Senayan in Jakarta, Indonesia.

Background
ONE Championship returns to Indonesia holding the contest between Luis Santos and Rafael Silva for the #1 contendership for the ONE Welterweight Championship against Ben Askren.

Results

ONE Championship: Union of Warriors

ONE Championship: Union of Warriors (also known as ONE Championship 39) was a mixed martial arts event held by ONE Championship. The event was held on March 18, 2016 at the Thuwanna Indoor Stadium in Yangon, Myanmar.

Background

Results

.

ONE Championship: Global Rivals

ONE Championship: Global Rivals (also known as ONE Championship 40) was a mixed martial arts event held by ONE Championship. The event was held on April 15, 2016 at the Mall of Asia Arena in Pasay, Philippines.

Background
ONE returned to the Philippines with another stacked card.

Results

ONE Championship: Ascent to Power

ONE Championship: Ascent to Power (also known as ONE Championship 41) was a mixed martial arts event held by ONE Championship. The event was held on May 6, 2016 at the Singapore Indoor Stadium in Kallang, Singapore.

Background
ONE Championship returned to Singapore with a fight night that included two championship contests, for the inaugural Cruiserweight (also known as Light heavyweight) and Women's Atomweight championships.

Results

ONE Championship: Kingdom of Champions

ONE Championship: Kingdom of Champions (also known as ONE Championship 42) was a mixed martial arts event held by ONE Championship. The event held on May 27, 2016 at the 12,000 capacity Impact Arena in Bangkok, Thailand.

Background
ONE makes its first visit to Thailand with an outstanding event, including music presentations from Thai top bands Big Ass and Bodyslam.

Results

ONE Championship: Dynasty of Champions (Anhui)

ONE Championship: Dynasty of Champions (Anhui) (also known as ONE Championship 43) was a mixed martial arts event held by ONE Championship. The event was held on July 2, 2016 at the Hefei Olympic Sports Centre in Anhui, China.

Background

Results

ONE Championship: Heroes of the World

ONE Championship: Heroes of the World (also known as ONE Championship 44) was a mixed martial arts event held by ONE Championship. The event was held on August 13, 2016 at the Cotai Arena in Cotai, Macau, China.

Results

ONE Championship: Titles and Titans

ONE Championship: Titles and Titans (also known as ONE Championship 45) was a mixed martial arts event held by ONE Championship. The event was held on August 27, 2016 at the Jakarta Convention Center in Jakarta, Indonesia.

Results

.

ONE Championship: Unbreakable Warriors

ONE Championship: Unbreakable Warriors (also known as ONE Championship 46) was a mixed martial arts event held by ONE Championship. The event was held on September 2, 2016 at the Stadium Negara in Kuala Lumpur, Malaysia.

Results

.

ONE Championship: State of Warriors

ONE Championship: State of Warriors (also known as ONE Championship 47) was a mixed martial arts event held by ONE Championship. The event was held on October 7, 2016 at the Thuwunna National Indoor Stadium in Yangon, Myanmar.

Results

.

ONE Championship: Defending Honor

ONE Championship: Defending Honor (also known as ONE Championship 48) was a mixed martial arts event held by ONE Championship. The event was held on November 11, 2016 at the Singapore Indoor Stadium in Kallang, Singapore.

Results

.

ONE Championship: Age of Domination

ONE Championship: Age of Domination (also known as ONE Championship 49) was a mixed martial arts event held by ONE Championship. The event was held on December 2, 2016 at the Mall of Asia Arena in Pasay, Philippines.

Results

See also
 2016 in UFC
 Bellator MMA in 2016
 2016 in Rizin Fighting Federation
 2016 in Absolute Championship Berkut 
 2016 in Konfrontacja Sztuk Walki
 2016 in Road FC 
 2016 in Kunlun Fight

References

External links
ONE Championship

ONE Championship events
ONE Championship events
2016 in mixed martial arts
2016 in kickboxing
2016-related lists